Bertrand Auban (born 18 January 1947) is a member of the Senate of France, representing the Haute-Garonne department.  He is a member of the Socialist Party.

References
Page on the Senate website

1947 births
Living people
Socialist Party (France) politicians
French Senators of the Fifth Republic
Senators of Haute-Garonne
Place of birth missing (living people)